Ridi pagliaccio is an album by Italian singer Mina, issued in 1988.

Track listing

CD 1
 Il portiere di notte - 5:37
 Moody's Mood - 2:27
 Canzoni stonate - 3:53
 This Masquerade - 4:23
 Into the Groove - 5:02
 It's Impossible (Somos novios) - 2:57
 Un'ora - 3:27
 You'll Never Never Know - 2:53
 La compagnia - 5:02
 I Left My Heart In San Francisco - 3:10
 Noi due nel mondo e nell'anima - 4:25

CD 2
 Ridi pagliaccio - 2:12
 Das Kind ist in dem Teller - 1:12
 Lui, lui, lui - 4:16
 È Natale - 4:20
 L'ultimo gesto di un clown - 4:03
 Dalai - 3:51
 Un tipo indipendente - 5:03
 Cuore, amore, cuore - 4:25
 Bignè - 4:06
 Rimani qui - 4:16

1988 albums
Mina (Italian singer) albums